Klára Kadlecová (born 4 April 1995 in Prague) is a Czech former competitive pair skater. Competing with Petr Bidař, she placed 7th at the 2011 European Championships in Bern and 15th at the 2011 World Championships in Moscow. In January 2012, Kadlecová confirmed that they had parted ways and she was searching for a new partner.

Programs 
(with Bidař)

Competitive highlights 
GP: Grand Prix; JGP: Junior Grand Prix

(with Bidař)

References

External links 

 

Czech female pair skaters
1995 births
Living people
Figure skaters from Prague